Atlético Tarazona was a Spanish football team  based in Tarazona de la Mancha, Albacete  in the autonomous community of Castile-La Mancha. Atlético Tarazona was founded in 1979. Tarazona's stadium is Estadio Faustino Alvarruiz with capacity of 3,000 seats.

The club was disbanded after 2010–11 season due to financial difficulties.

Season to season 
{|
|valign="top" width=49%|

6 seasons in Tercera División

Famous players

Tarazona Femenino

External links 
1ª Autonómica
Profile at ffcm.es

Association football clubs established in 1979
Association football clubs disestablished in 2011
Defunct football clubs in Castilla–La Mancha
1979 establishments in Spain
2011 disestablishments in Spain
Province of Albacete